Rhacophorus nigropunctatus is a species of frog in the family Rhacophoridae. It is found in China, possibly Myanmar, and possibly Vietnam.

Its natural habitats are temperate forests, subtropical or tropical moist lowland forests, subtropical or tropical moist montane forests, subtropical or tropical moist shrubland, rivers, freshwater marshes, intermittent freshwater marshes, ponds, and irrigated land.

It is becoming rare due to habitat loss.

References

nigropunctatus
Amphibians of China
Endemic fauna of China
Taxonomy articles created by Polbot
Taxobox binomials not recognized by IUCN